= Ganj-e-Arshadi =

18th century persian manuscript

- Author: Abu’l-Fayyāż Qamar-al-Ḥaqq
- Original title: گنج ارشدی
- Language: Persian
- Subject: Life of Aršad Badr-al-Ḥaqq Jaunpuri and Sufi saints
- Genre: Malfuzat, Sufism
- Published: 1721-1722
- Publication place: India
- Media type: Manuscript

Ganj-e-Arshadi is a Persian book compiled by Abu’l-Fayyāż Qamar-al-Ḥaqq in 1721-1722 from the notes made by Shaikh ʿAbd-al-Šakūr. It is the malfuzat (sayings) of Aršad Badr-al-Ḥaqq Jaunpuri. It consists of Information related to the life and times of Aršad Badr-al-Ḥaqq Jaunpuri and the Sufi saints of Uttar Pradesh, Bihar, and Bengal.
